Kaboora Institute of Higher Education is a university in Kabul, the capital city of Afghanistan.

See also 
List of universities in Afghanistan

References

External links
Kaboora Institute of Higher Education website (2019 archive)

Universities and colleges in Kabul
Private universities in Afghanistan